This is a list of public art in South Ayrshire, one of the 32 local government council areas of Scotland and covers the southern part of Ayrshire. The council area borders onto Dumfries and Galloway, East Ayrshire and North Ayrshire. This list applies only to works of public art on permanent display in an outdoor public space and does not, for example, include artworks in museums.

Ayr

Girvan

Maybole

Monkton

Prestwick

Troon

References

South Ayrshire
Public art
Outdoor sculptures in Scotland
Statues in Scotland